Game Changer or Game Changers may refer to:

Music
 Game Changer (Johnny Gill album), 2014, or the title song
 Game Changer (Rawsrvnt album), 2015
 Game Changer, an album by Ali Ryerson and the Jazz Flute Big Band 
 Game Changer, an album by Golden Child
 "Game Changer", a song by James Reid from James Reid
 "Game Changer", a song by Imelda May from Life Love Flesh Blood
 "Game Changer", a song by Mist from Diamond in the Dirt (EP)
 "The Game Changer", a song by American rapper Saigon from The Greatest Story Never Told Chapter 2: Bread and Circuses

Film and television
 "Game Changer" (Modern Family), an episode of Modern Family
 The Gamechangers, a 2015 BBC-produced docudrama about Rockstar Games and Jack Thompson
 Gareth Thomas: Game Changer - 2014, a documentary production of Zipline Creative Limited
 Survivor: Game Changers, the 34th season of U.S. reality series Survivor
 The Game Changer, a 2017 Chinese action film
 The Game Changers, a 2018 documentary directed by Louie Psihoyos
 Game Changer, a comedy game show on the streaming service Dropout

Other
 GameChanger, a mobile app and website that provides scorekeeping, stats, Live GameStreams
 GameChangers, an IT education and research program
 Game Changer, a proposal of Australia's The Wilderness Society
 Game Changer, an 2019 chess book by Matthew Sadler and Natasha Regan
 Game Changer, alternative title of a painting by Banksy, Painting for Saints

See also
 Game Change (film), a 2012 American HBO political drama film
 Game Change (book), a book by John Heilemann and Mark Halperin about the 2008 United States presidential election
 Double Down: Game Change 2012, a book by John Heilemann and Mark Halperin about the 2012 United States presidential election
 Changing the Game (disambiguation)
 Games for Change, a movement dedicated to using digital games for social change